The Reinhard Cirrus was a glider built in Germany in the 1930s, with a similar arrangement to the Akaflieg Darmstadt D-30 Cirrus, but with  span wings.

Glider aircraft